Shingba Rhododendron Sanctuary is a nature park in the Indian state of Sikkim. It has forty species of rhododendron trees. It is located in the Yumthang Valley of Flowers north of Lachung in North Sikkim district. Bird species found in the park include Wood snipe and Hoary-throated barwing. The sanctuary is part of the Sacred Himalayan Landscape.

References

Protected areas of Sikkim
Mangan district
Wildlife sanctuaries in Sikkim
1984 establishments in Sikkim
Protected areas established in 1984